Florina Pierdevara (born 29 March 1990) is a Romanian middle-distance runner. She competed in the 1500 metres at the 2015 World Championships in Beijing without advancing from the first round.

International competitions

Personal bests
Outdoor
800 metres – 2:00.91 (Mungyeong 2015)
1000 metres – 2:39.69 (Bucharest 2015)
1500 metres – 4:07.95 (Lignano Sabbiadoro 2015)
Indoor
800 metres – 2:04.12 (Bucharest 2015)
1500 metres – 4:16.01 (Istanbul 2015)

References

External links
 

1990 births
Living people
Romanian female middle-distance runners
World Athletics Championships athletes for Romania
Place of birth missing (living people)
Athletes (track and field) at the 2016 Summer Olympics
Olympic athletes of Romania
Competitors at the 2013 Summer Universiade
European Games competitors for Romania
Athletes (track and field) at the 2019 European Games
20th-century Romanian women
21st-century Romanian women